Eugène Cyrille Brunet was a French sculptor, born in Sarcelles in 1828 to André Brunet and Aglaé-Julie Drouet. He died in 1921.
Brunet studied under Armand Toussaint at the École des beaux-arts. There he met Édouard Manet and the two made a study trip to Florence in 1857. In October 1861 he married Caroline de Pène,<ref>Annuaire de la noblesse de France et des maisons souveraines de l'Europe, vol. 19, Paris 1862, p.272</ref> who was painted by Manet about that time. A mustached head and shoulders of the artist himself appears looking to one side in the left background of Manet's La Musique aux Tuileries''
(1862). In Manet's address book he is recorded as living in Brittany.

A sculptor of Classical subjects, Brunet is best known for his sensuous marble statue of the recumbent Messalina, exhibited at the 1884 Salon.

References

External links

1828 births
1921 deaths
People from Sarcelles
20th-century French sculptors
19th-century French sculptors
French male sculptors
19th-century French male artists